A Model from Paris (Spanish: Un modelo de París) is a 1946 Argentine comedy film directed by Luis Bayón Herrera and starring Pedro Quartucci, Tilda Thamar and Francisco Álvarez.

The film's art direction was by Juan Manuel Concado.

Cast
 Pedro Quartucci 
 Tilda Thamar 
 Francisco Álvarez
 Yvonne Bastien
 Carlos Castro 
 Delfy de Ortega 
 Adrián Cuneo 
 Enrique García Satur 
 Alberto Terrones 
 Carlos Enríquez
 María del Río

References

Bibliography 
 César Maranghello. Breve historia del cine argentino. Celesa, 2005.

External links 
 

1946 films
1946 comedy films
Argentine comedy films
1940s Spanish-language films
Films directed by Luis Bayón Herrera
Argentine black-and-white films
1940s Argentine films